Friheden is a station on the Køge radial of the S-train network in Copenhagen, Denmark.

See also
 List of railway stations in Denmark

References

S-train (Copenhagen) stations
Railway stations opened in 1972
Railway stations in Denmark opened in the 20th century